The Mescalero Ridge forms the western edge of the great Llano Estacado, a vast plateau or tableland in the southwestern United States in New Mexico and Texas. It is the western equivalent of the Caprock Escarpment, which defines the eastern edge of the Llano Estacado.

Mescalero Sands
Extending north-south along the western edge of the Mescalero Ridge lies a vast sand sheet called the Mescalero Sands, named after the Mescalero Apaches who once hunted in these sandhills.  In 1928, Nelson Horatio Darton of the United States Geological Survey observed: “On the east side of the Pecos Valley in southern New Mexico there are very extensive sand hills formed of deposits known as the ‘Mescalero Sands,’ which are doubtless of Quaternary age ...”  In places, these sands climb up and over the Mescalero Ridge and spread out over portions of the Llano Estacado.

See also

Eastern New Mexico
West Texas
Pecos River
Caprock Escarpment
Llano Estacado

References

External links
High Plains Historical Foundation

Landforms of Chaves County, New Mexico
Landforms of Eddy County, New Mexico
Landforms of New Mexico
Geology of New Mexico
Landforms of Texas
Geology of Texas
Landforms of Lea County, New Mexico